Wǔ is a Chinese surname. It is pronounced Mo in Cantonese. In Vietnamese is written Vũ or Võ. As a Chinese word, it carries the meanings "martial", "military", "martial arts".

Origins
 from Wu Luo (武羅), which is said to be either the name of a prehistoric state in present-day Guangxi or an official of the prehistoric Xia dynasty
 from the posthumous title of Duke Wu of Song (r. 765–748 BCE), Spring and Autumn period ruler of Song, in present-day Shangqiu, Henan
 from the posthumous name of Wu Ding king of the Shang dynasty 
 from the personal name of a son of King Ping of Zhou, first king of the Eastern Zhou dynasty

Notable people
 Wu Zetian (武則天; 624–705), the only Empress Regnant in China's history
 Wu Chengsi (武承嗣; d. 698), Prince Xuan of Wei (魏宣王), nephew of Wu Zetian 
 Wu Youji (武攸暨; d. 712), Prince Zhongjian of Ding (定忠簡王), husband of Princess Taiping
 Wu Song (武松), legendary hero from the Chinese classic novel Outlaws of the Marsh
 Maggie Wu (武卫; born 1969), Chinese business executive and Chief Financial Officer of Alibaba Group
 Wu Yuxiang (武禹襄; 1812–1880), t'ai chi ch'üan teacher and government official active during the late Qing dynasty
 Wu Changshun (武长顺; born 1954), former police chief of the municipality of Tianjin, China
 Wu Dawei (武大伟; born 1946), former special representative for Korean Peninsula Affairs and former Vice-Minister of Foreign Affairs of the People's Republic of China
 Wu Lei (武磊; born 1991), Chinese footballer
 Wu Weihua (武维华; born 1956), chair of the Jiusan Society, a minority party in the People's Republic of China
 Wu Yi (武艺; born 1990), also known as Philip Wu and Philip Lau, Chinese pop singer

References